Saltego trans Jarmiloj (English: Leap across the Millennia) is the second novel originally written in Esperanto by Jean Forge.  It appeared in 1924 (192 pages).  It is a fantasy, whose characters are transported out of our time into a past epoch.  Written in a simple lively style, despite its humor and other attractions, it does not reach the level of Forge's first novel, Abismoj.

Sources 

The first version of this article was translated from the Esperanto Vikipedio.

1924 German novels
1924 science fiction novels
Saltego
German science fiction novels
Novels about time travel
Esperanto in Germany
Novels by Jean Forge